Barrow Kunda is a town in the Gambia. Barrow is the name of the Alkalo (village chief) and Kunda means compound.  It is located in Wuli District in the Upper River Division. There is another Barrow Kunda located in Foni Kansala district which is not to be confused with this Barrow Kunda. The Barrow Kunda in Foni Kansala District (Bwiam) has a newly built modern hospital and also a new indoor market which as of mid-2010 is still unopened.  The main road S. Bank Road runs through the village.  The Alkalo is intending to put the town on the map as a modern town so he is offering land to foreigners who would like to settle in this rural location at a lower cost compared to other more coastal or town based areas.  A growing number of foreign nationals have bought and own land in Barrow Kunda.  There are also some new developments due to begin construction in 2012, so this village although quiet and rural is set to become modern whilst retaining its calm and peaceful rural location.  Those who want rural but modern should consider Barrow Kunda in Foni Kansala District (Bwiam).  The Barrow Kunda in Wuli District has as of 2009, an estimated population of 1 730.

References 

Populated places in the Gambia
Upper River Division